Steve Lewis, Stephen Lewis, or Steven Lewis may refer to:

Stephen Lewis (born 1937), Canadian politician and diplomat
Stephen Lewis (actor) (1926–2015), English actor
Stephen Brimson Lewis, British scenic designer
Steve Lewis (diver) (born 1950), cave and wreck diver
Steve Lewis (musician) (1896–1941), jazz pianist and composer
Steve Lewis (racing), racing team owner
Steve Lewis (sprinter) (born 1969), former American track and field athlete
Steven Lewis (born 1986), British pole vaulter
C. J. Lewis (born Steven James Lewis, 1967), British reggae singer